Sir Robin Spencer KC (born 8 July 1955), styled The Hon. Mr Justice Spencer, is a judge of the High Court of England and Wales.

He was educated at The King's School, Chester and Emmanuel College, Cambridge.

He was called to the bar at Gray's Inn in 1978 and became a bencher there in 2005. He was appointed a Queen's Counsel in 1999, deputy judge of the High Court from 2001 to 2010, and judge of the High Court of Justice (Queen's Bench Division) since 2010. In 2013 he was appointed as Presiding Judge on the South Eastern Circuit.

Sally Clark trial

In 1999 Spencer was leading Counsel for the prosecution in the trial of Sally Clark, a solicitor charged with the murder of her two babies. Clark was found guilty and sent to prison. She maintained her innocence and eventually her convictions were overturned at a second appeal and she was freed in 2003.

Clark's husband, also a solicitor, made a complaint about the conduct of Spencer and his prosecution team. A Bar Council  appointed QC prepared a charge sheet containing eight acts or omissions prejudicial to the administration of justice, but Mr Justice MacKinnon struck out the complaints.

Jimmy Mubenga death in custody trial

In 2014 Spencer was the judge in the trial of three G4S security guards charged with the manslaughter of Angolan Jimmy Mubenga.
Spencer ruled that abusive racist text messages found on the mobile phones of two of the guards had 'no real relevance' to the trial. The three were acquitted.

Joanna Dennehy trial
In 2014, Spencer was the sentencing judge for the Peterborough ditch murders sentencing Joanna Dennehy to life imprisonment with a Whole life order for the murders of 3 men in Cambrideshire, England

See also
Peterborough ditch murders

References

1955 births
Living people
People educated at The King's School, Chester
Alumni of Emmanuel College, Cambridge
Members of Gray's Inn
Queen's Bench Division judges
Knights Bachelor